James Bollinger was an American boxer, who competed under the name Carroll Burton. He competed in the men's lightweight event at the 1904 Summer Olympics.

References

Year of birth missing
Year of death missing
American male boxers
Olympic boxers of the United States
Boxers at the 1904 Summer Olympics
Place of birth missing
Lightweight boxers